Angelidou is a Greek surname. Notable people with the surname include:

 Klairi Angelidou (1932–2021), Cypriot educator, poet, translator, and politician
 Marlen Angelidou, Cypriot singer and actress

See also
 Angelides
 Angelidis

Greek-language surnames